Nguyễn Thị Anh Thư (born April 26, 1982) is a Vietnamese actor. She is known in Vietnam for her role as Thủy in Long Legged Girls in 2004, and lead roles in the television series  Tropical Snow (2006), Hoa thiên điểu (2008).

Filmography

Film

Television series

Awards and nominations

References

1982 births
Living people
Vietnamese actresses
Vietnamese television actresses
Vietnamese film actresses
20th-century Vietnamese actresses
21st-century Vietnamese actresses
People from Ho Chi Minh City